Patrick Aisowieren is a Nigerian politician representing the Oriowo/Uhumwonde constituency in the 9th National Assembly in the House of Representatives of Nigeria.

Early life and education 
Hon Patrick was born on October 14, 1972, to the family of Aisowieren in Orhionmwon Local Government Area of Edo State, Nigeria.
He finished the Eweka Grammar School with a Senior School Certificate. He furthered his education at the College of Education in Agbor, Edo State, and received his Nigeria Certificate in Education (NCE) in 1997. He graduated with a Bachelor's front Delta State University in 2001.

Career

Politics 
He was chosen to serve as a councillor in Edo State in 2003. He held that position up to his election to the Edo State House of Assembly in 2007. He was a member of the House from 2007 to 2011 and again from 2011 to 2015.
Hon Aisowieren was chosen in 2015 to represent Orhionmwon/Uhunmwode Constituency in the Federal House of Representatives on the platform of the All Progressive Congress (APC).

Reference 

1972 births
People from Edo State
Edo State politicians
Edo State House of Assembly elections
Living people